HarperCollins Publishers LLC is one of the Big Five English-language publishing companies, alongside Penguin Random House, Simon & Schuster, Hachette, and Macmillan. The company is headquartered in New York City and is a subsidiary of News Corp. The name is a combination of several publishing firm names: Harper & Row, an American publishing company acquired in 1987—whose own name was the result of an earlier merger of Harper & Brothers (founded in 1817) and Row, Peterson & Company—together with Scottish publishing company William Collins, Sons (founded in 1819), acquired in 1989.

The worldwide CEO of HarperCollins is Brian Murray. HarperCollins has publishing groups in the United States, Canada, the United Kingdom, Australia, New Zealand, Brazil, India, and China. The company publishes many different imprints, both former independent publishing houses and new imprints.

History

Collins

Harper

Mergers and acquisitions
Collins was bought by Rupert Murdoch's News Corporation in 1989, and was combined with Harper & Row, which NewsCorp had acquired two years earlier. In addition to the simplified and merged name, the logo for HarperCollins was derived from the torch logo for Harper and Row, and the fountain logo for Collins, which were combined into a stylized depiction of flames atop waves.

In 1990, HarperCollins sold J. B. Lippincott & Co., its medical publishing division, to the Dutch publisher Wolters Kluwer.

In 1996, HarperCollins sold Scott Foresman and HarperCollins College to Pearson, which merged them with Addison-Wesley Longman.

News Corporation purchased the Hearst Book Group, consisting of William Morrow & Company and Avon Books, in 1999. These imprints are now published under the rubric of HarperCollins. HarperCollins bought educational publisher Letts and Lonsdale in March 2010.

In 2011, HarperCollins announced they had agreed to acquire the publisher Thomas Nelson. The purchase was completed on 11 July 2012, with an announcement that Thomas Nelson would operate independently given the position it has in Christian book publishing. Both Thomas Nelson and Zondervan were then organized as imprints, or "keystone publishing programs," under a new division, HarperCollins Christian Publishing. Key roles in the reorganization were awarded to former Thomas Nelson executives.

In 2012, HarperCollins acquired part of the trade operations of John Wiley & Son in Canada.

In 2014, HarperCollins acquired Canadian romance publisher Harlequin Enterprises for C$455 million.

In 2018, HarperCollins acquired the business publisher Amacom from the American Management Association.

In 2020, HarperCollins acquired the children's publishers Egmont Books UK, Egmont Poland and Schneiderbuch Germany from the Egmont Group.

On 29 March 2021, HarperCollins announced that it would acquire HMH Books & Media, the trade publishing division of Houghton Mifflin Harcourt, for $349 million. The deal would allow HMH to pay down its debt and focus on digital education. The deal was completed on 10 May. As of 7 July 2021, HMH's adult books will be published as Mariner Books, while HMH's children's books will be published as Clarion Books.

In 2021, HarperCollins acquired the British publishers Pavilion Books.

In 2022 HarperCollins acquired Cider Mill Press.

Management history
Brian Murray, the current CEO of HarperCollins, succeeded Jane Friedman who was CEO from 1997 to 2008. Notable management figures include Lisa Sharkey, current senior vice president and director of creative development and Barry Winkleman from 1989 to 1994.

United States v. Apple Inc. 
In April 2012, the United States Department of Justice filed United States v. Apple Inc., naming Apple, HarperCollins, and four other major publishers as defendants.  The suit alleged that they conspired to fix prices for e-books, and weaken Amazon.com's position in the market, in violation of antitrust law.

In December 2013, a federal judge approved a settlement of the antitrust claims, in which HarperCollins and the other publishers paid into a fund that provided credits to customers who had overpaid for books due to the price-fixing.

US warehouse closings
On 5 November 2012, HarperCollins announced to employees privately and then later in the day publicly that it  was closing its remaining two US warehouses,  to merge shipping and warehousing operations with R. R. Donnelley in Indiana. The Scranton, Pennsylvania, warehouse closed in September 2013 and a Nashville, Tennessee, warehouse, under the name  Thomas Nelson (which distributes the religious arm of HarperCollins/Zondervan Books), in the winter of 2013. Several office positions and departments continued to work for HarperCollins in Scranton, but in a new location.

The Scranton warehouse closing eliminated about 200 jobs, and the Nashville warehouse closing eliminated up to 500 jobs; the exact number of distribution employees is unknown.

HarperCollins previously closed two US warehouses, one in Williamsport, Pennsylvania, in 2011 and another in Grand Rapids, Michigan, in 2012. "We have taken a long-term, global view of our print distribution and are committed to offering the broadest possible reach for our authors," said HarperCollins Chief Executive Brian Murray, according to Publishers Weekly. "We are retooling the traditional distribution model to ensure we can competitively offer the entire HarperCollins catalog to customers regardless of location." Company officials attribute the closings and mergers to the rapidly growing demand for e-book formats and the decline in print purchasing.

Internet Archive lawsuit
In June 2020, HarperCollins was one of a group of publishers who sued the Internet Archive, arguing that its collection of e-books was denying authors and publishers revenue and accusing the library of "willful mass copyright infringement".

Lindsay Lohan lawsuit 
In September 2020, HarperCollins sued Lindsay Lohan for entering into a book deal and collecting a $350,000 advance for a tell-all memoir that never materialized.

Anne Frank's betrayal
A 2022 book written by Rosemary Sullivan, with HarperCollins as main publisher, designated a Jewish notary as the most likely suspect in Anne Frank's betrayal. The conclusion was challenged by experts. The notary's family members threatened a lawsuit and started a foundation. The Dutch publisher withdrew the book, but HarperCollins has not taken any definitive decision.

UAW strike
On 10 November 2022, approximately 250 unionized workers at HarperCollins began an indefinite strike. Local 2110 of the United Auto Workers (UAW) union includes people in design, marketing, publicity, and sales for the company. The UAW union made the decision to strike after drawn-out negotiations between it and HarperCollins, which resulted in members "working without a contract since April." According to a spokesperson, HarperCollins "has agreed to a number of proposals that the UAW is seeking to include in a new contract" and "is disappointed an agreement has not been reached" but "will continue to negotiate in good faith."

On 21 December 2022 the local put their in-person picketing on "pause" to give strikers an opportunity to spend time with their loved ones. The picketing resumed as scheduled on 3 January 2023.

After three months of collective action, the union agreed to a new contract with HarperCollins on February 16th 2023.
 
Under the new terms, the annual starting pay of HarperCollins employees has increased from $45,000 to $47,500 upon ratification, and is set to rise to $50,000 by 2025. Additionally, full-time employees in the union will receive a lump sum payment of $1,500. The contract also allows workers making less than $60,000 to file for two hours of overtime pay per week without approval from a manager, and puts measures in place to compensate junior-level staff for diversity and inclusion work which is typically unpaid in the industry.

The workers returned to their desks on February 21st.

Noted books
HarperCollins maintains the backlist of many of the books originally published by its many merged imprints, in addition to having picked up new authors since the merger. Authors published originally by Harper include Mark Twain, the Brontë sisters, and William Makepeace Thackeray. Authors published originally by Collins include H. G. Wells and Agatha Christie. HarperCollins also acquired the publishing rights to J. R. R. Tolkien's work in 1990 when Unwin Hyman was bought. This is a list of some of the more noted books and series published by HarperCollins and their various imprints and merged publishing houses.

 The Hobbit, J. R. R. Tolkien (1937) (originally published by George Allen & Unwin)
 The Lord of the Rings, J. R. R. Tolkien (1954–1955) (originally published by George Allen & Unwin)
 The Art of Loving, Erich Fromm (1956)
 Master and Commander, Patrick O'Brian (1970) (adapted into the 2003 film Master and Commander: The Far Side of the World)
 the Leaphorn and Chee books, Tony Hillerman (1970–2006)
 The Silmarillion, J. R. R. Tolkien (ed. Christopher Tolkien with Guy Gavriel Kay) (1977) (originally published by George Allen & Unwin)
 Collins English Dictionary (1979), a major dictionary
 Sharpe series, Bernard Cornwell (1981–2006)
 Frida: A Biography of Frida Kahlo, Hayden Herrera (1983), adapted into the 2002 film Frida
 The History of Middle-earth series, J. R. R. Tolkien (ed. Christopher Tolkien) (1983–1996)
 Weaveworld, Clive Barker (1987)
 the Paladin Poetry Series (1987–1993)
 The Alchemist, Paulo Coelho, (1988) (first published in Portuguese as O Alquimista, 1988)
 subsequent novels in the Take Back Plenty series, Colin Greenland (1990+)
 Where There's a Will: Who Inherited What and Why, Stephen M. Silverman (1991)
Dorothy Wordsworth's Illustrated Lakeland Journals (1991, Diamond Books)
 The Language of the Genes, Steve Jones (1993)
 The Gifts of the Body, Rebecca Brown (1994)
 Microserfs, Douglas Coupland (1995)
 Thoughts, Tionne Watkins (1999)
 Shuka Saptati: Seventy tales of the Parrot a new translation from the Sanskrit by A. N. D. Haksar (2000)
 First They Killed My Father: A Daughter of Cambodia Remembers, Loung Ung (2000)
 Bel Canto, Ann Patchett (2001)
 A Theory of Relativity, Jacquelyn Mitchard (2001)
 recent volumes in the Discworld series by Terry Pratchett (books from 2001 to present)
 American Gods, Neil Gaiman (2001)
 Boonville, Robert Mailer Anderson (2003 reprint)
 Quicksilver, Neal Stephenson (2003)
 Don Quixote, a new translation by Edith Grossman  (2003, Ecco)
 Acquainted with the Night, Christopher Dewdney (2004)
 State of fear, by Michael Crichton  (2004)
 Darkhouse, Alex Barclay (2005)
 Anansi Boys, Neil Gaiman (2005)
 The Hot Kid, Elmore Leonard (2005)
 Freaky Green Eyes, by Joyce Carol Oates (2006)
 Next, Michael Crichton (2006)
 Domicilium Decoratus, Kelly Wearstler (2006) 
 Pretty Little Liars, Sara Shepard (2006)
 Mister B. Gone, Clive Barker (Harper) (2007)
 Loving Natalee: A Mother's Testament of Hope and Faith, Beth Holloway (2007) (about Natalee Holloway)
 The Raw Shark Texts, Steven Hall (2007)
 The Children of Húrin, J. R. R. Tolkien (ed. Christopher Tolkien) (2007)
 The Family: The Secret Fundamentalism at the Heart of American Power, Jeff Sharlet (2008)
 Going Rogue: An American Life, Sarah Palin (2009)
 Pirate Latitudes, Michael Crichton (2009) (posthumous publication)
 Wolf Hall, Hilary Mantel (2009)
 Shattered: The True Story of a Mother's Love, a Husband's Betrayal, and a Cold-Blooded Texas Murder, Kathryn Casey (2010)
 Micro, Michael Crichton (2011) (posthumous publication)
 The Dressmaker of Khair Khana, Gayle Tzemach Lemmon (2011)
 A Shot at History: My Obsessive Journey to Olympic Gold by Abhinav Bindra (2011)
 Go Set a Watchman, Harper Lee (2015)
 The Poppy War, R.F. Kuang (2018)

Harper children's books
Children's book editor Ursula Nordstrom was the director of Harper's Department of Books for Boys and Girls from 1940 to 1973, overseeing the publication of classics such as Goodnight Moon, Where the Wild Things Are, The Giving Tree, Charlotte's Web, Beverly Cleary's series starring Ramona Quimby, and Harold and the Purple Crayon. They were the publishing home of Maurice Sendak, Shel Silverstein, and Margaret Wise Brown. In 1998, Nordstrom's personal correspondence was published as Dear Genius: The Letters of Ursula Nordstrom (illustrated by Maurice Sendak), edited by Charlotte Zolotow. Zolotow began her career as a stenographer to Nordstrom, became her protégé, and went on to write more than 80 books and edit hundreds of others, including Nordstrom's The Secret Language and the works of Paul Fleischman. Zolotow later became head of the children's books department, and went on to become the company's first female vice president.

The Chronicles of Narnia series by C.S. Lewis, while not originally published by a merged imprint of HarperCollins, was acquired by the publisher.

HarperCollins has published these notable children's books:

 the I Can Read! series for beginning readers, including the Amelia Bedelia (Peggy Parish), Frog and Toad (Arnold Lobel) and Little Bear (Else Holmelund Minarik and Maurice Sendak) books
 the Warriors series (2003–present)
 the Pretty Little Liars series, by Sara Shepard (2007–present)
 A Series of Unfortunate Events, Lemony Snicket
 A Taste of Blackberries, Doris Buchanan Smith (1973)
 Skulduggery Pleasant series, Derek Landy
 Bart Simpson's Guide to Life (1993)
 international rights to Dr. Seuss (inherited from Collins; 1950s-present)
 Love That Dog, Sharon Creech (2001)
 The Giving Tree, Shel Silverstein (1964)
 Where the Sidewalk Ends (book), Shel Silverstein (1974)
 The Saga of Darren Shan, Darren Shan (2000–2004)
 Cirque du Freak manga series, Darren Shan and Takahiro Arai (2006–2009)
 The Dangerous Book for Boys, Conn and Hal Iggulden (2006)
 Sabriel, Garth Nix (1995)
 A Barrel of Laughs, a Vale of Tears, Jules Feiffer (1995)
 Mister God, This Is Anna, Fynn (pseudonym of Sydney Hopkins) (1974)
 the Little House on the Prairie series, Laura Ingalls Wilder (1932–2006)
 The Wolves in the Walls, Neil Gaiman and Dave McKean (2003)
 Monster, Walter Dean Myers (1999)
 Coraline, Neil Gaiman and Dave McKean (2002)
 Surviving the Applewhites, Stephanie S. Tolan (2002)
 The Gollywhopper Games (2008)
 Ruby Redfort (series), Lauren Child (2011)
 Divergent, Veronica Roth (2011)
 Survivors series (2012-2019)
 The School for Good and Evil, Soman Chainani (2013–present)
 Splat the Cat, Rob Scotton (2007–present)
 The Secret Zoo, Bryan Chick (2010–2023)
Charlotte's Web, E. B. White (2015)
 Little Penguin, Tadgh Bentley (2015–present)
 Elinor Wonders Why adapted books (2021–present)

Imprints
HarperCollins has more than 120 book imprints, most of which are based in the United States. Collins still exists as an imprint, chiefly for wildlife and natural history books, field guides, as well as for English and bilingual dictionaries based on the Bank of English, a large corpus of contemporary English texts.

HarperCollins imprints (current and defunct, including imprints that existed prior to various mergers) include:

Current

Adult

Children

 HarperCollins Children's Books
 Harper Festival, a publisher of novelty books founded in 1992
 HarperTeen
 HarperTeen Impulse (digital imprint)
 HarperTrophy
 Amistad
 Balzer + Bray
 Collins
 Clarion Books
 Greenwillow Books
 Heartdrum
 HMH Books for Young Readers
 Katherine Tegen Books
 Walden Pond Press
 Blink Young Adult
Farshore (formerly Egmont Books UK)
Electric Monkey

Christian

 Thomas Nelson
 Grupo Nelson
 Nelson Books
 Tommy Nelson
 W Publishing Group
 WestBow Press 
 Zondervan
 Editorial Vida
 Zonderkidz
Zondervan Academic
Zondervan Reflective

Audio
 HarperAudio
 Caedmon, audiobooks
 HarperCollins Children's Audio

Bureau
 HarperCollins Speakers Bureau

Digital
 HarperCollins e-Books
 HarperCollins Productions

Defunct

Business strategy

Web approach
In 2008, HarperCollins launched a browsing feature on its website to allow customers can read selected excerpts from books before purchasing, on both desktop and mobile browsers. This functionality gave the publisher's website the ability to compete with physical bookstores, in which customers can typically look at the book itself, and Amazon's use of excerpts ("teasers") for online book purchasers.

At the beginning of October 2013, the company announced a partnership with online digital library Scribd. The official statement revealed that the "majority" of the HarperCollins US and HarperCollins Christian catalogs will be available in Scribd's subscription service. Chantal Restivo-Alessi, chief digital officer at HarperCollins, explained to the media that the deal represents the first time that the publisher has released such a large portion of its catalog.

HarperCollins formerly operated authonomy, an online community of authors, from 2008 to 2015. The website offered an alternative to the traditional "slush pile" approach for handling unsolicited manuscripts sent to a publisher with little chance of being reviewed. Using authonomy, authors could submit their work for peer review and ranking by other members; the five highest-ranked manuscripts each month would be read by HarperCollins editors for potential publication. The site was closed after authors "learned to game the system" to earn top-five rankings, and fewer authonomy titles were selected to be published.

From 2009 to 2010, HarperCollins operated Bookarmy, a social networking site.

Speakers Bureau
The HarperCollins Speakers Bureau (also known as HCSB) is the first lecture agency to be created by a major publishing house. It was launched in May 2005 as a division of HarperCollins to book paid speaking engagements for the authors HarperCollins, and its sister companies, publish. Andrea Rosen is the director.

Some of the notable authors the HCSB represents include Carol Alt, Dennis Lehane, Gregory Maguire, Danny Meyer, Mehmet Oz, Sidney Poitier, Ted Sorensen, and Kate White.

HarperAcademic
HarperAcademic is the academic marketing department of HarperCollins.  HarperAcademic provides instructors with the latest in adult titles for course adoption at the high school and college level, as well as titles for first-year and other common read programs at academic institutions.  They also attend several major academic conferences to showcase new titles for academic professionals.

HarperAcademic Calling, a podcast produced by the department, provides interviews with authors of noteworthy titles.

HarperStudio
HarperCollins announced HarperStudio in 2008 as a "new, experimental unit... that will eliminate the traditional profit distributions to authors. The long-established author advances and bookseller returns has not proved to be very profitable to either the author or the publisher. The approach HarperStudio is now taking is to offer little or no advance, but instead to split the profit 50% (rather than the industry standard 15%), with the author." The division was headed by Bob Miller, previously the founding publisher of Hyperion, the adult books division of the Walt Disney Company. HarperStudio folded in March 2010 after Miller left for Workman Publishing.

HarperCollins India

HarperCollins Publishers India Pvt Ltd. is a wholly owned subsidiary of HarperCollins Worldwide. It came into being in 1992.

Controversies

If I Did It

If I Did It was a book written by O. J. Simpson about his alleged murder of Nicole Simpson, which was planned as a HarperCollins title, and which attracted considerable controversy and a legal battle over publication.

Ben Collins
In August 2010, the company became embroiled in a legal battle with the BBC after a book it was due to publish, later identified as the forthcoming autobiography of racing driver Ben Collins, revealed the identity of The Stig from Top Gear. In his blog, Top Gear executive producer Andy Wilman accused HarperCollins of "hoping to cash in" on the BBC's intellectual property, describing the publishers as "a bunch of chancers". On 1 September, the BBC's request for an injunction preventing the book from being published was turned down, effectively confirming the book's revelation that "The Stig" was indeed Collins.

East and West
The company became embroiled in controversy in 1998 after it was revealed it blocked Chris Patten's (the last British governor of Hong Kong) book East and West after a direct intervention by the then-CEO of News International, Rupert Murdoch. It was later revealed by Stuart Proffitt, the editor who had worked on the book for HarperCollins, that this intervention was designed to appease the Chinese authorities—of whom the book was critical—as Murdoch intended to extend his business empire into China and did not wish to cause problems there by allowing the book to be published.

Murdoch's intervention caused both Proffitt's resignation from the company and outrage from the international media apart from affiliated companies. Chris Patten later published with Macmillan Publishing, initially in America, where it carried the logo "The book that Rupert Murdoch refused to publish". After a successful legal campaign against HarperCollins, Patten went on to publish the book in the UK in September 1998 after accepting a sum of £500,000 and receiving an apology from Rupert Murdoch.

Ebooks
In March 2011, HarperCollins announced it would distribute ebooks to libraries with DRM enabled to delete the item after being lent 26 times.  HarperCollins has drawn criticism of this plan, in particular its likening of ebooks, which are purely digital, to traditional paperback trade books, which wear over time.

Omission of Israel from an atlas
In December 2014, The Tablet reported that an atlas published for Middle East schools did not label Israel on a map of the Middle East. A representative for Collins Bartholomew, a subsidiary of HarperCollins that specializes in maps, explained that including Israel would have been "unacceptable" to their customers in the Arab states of the Persian Gulf and the omission was in line with "local preferences". The company later apologized and destroyed all the books.

What the (Bleep) Just Happened? 
HarperCollins announced in January 2017 that they would discontinue selling copies of Monica Crowley's book What the (Bleep) Just Happened?, due to allegations of plagiarism. The 2012 book had lifted passages from a number of sources including columns, news articles and think tank reports. HarperCollins said in a statement to CNN's KFile, "The book which has reached the end of its natural sales cycle, will no longer be offered for purchase until such time as the author has the opportunity to source and revise the material."

See also

 Books in the United States
 COBUILD – a research facility set up by Collins in conjunction with the University of Birmingham
 Harper's Magazine – a separately owned magazine, although begun by the original Harper & Brothers
 List of largest UK book publishers
 The Lord of the Rings; HarperCollins is the current non-US publisher of the Tolkien series

References

External links
 
 Greenwillow Books records, 1974–2014

 
1989 establishments in New York City
Book publishing companies based in New York (state)
Book publishing companies of the United Kingdom
News Corporation subsidiaries
Publishing companies based in New York City
Publishing companies established in 1989